Jean Marie Cayrecastel better known as Jehan (stylized as JeHaN) (born in Montluçon in 1957) is a French songwriter and singer. He is one of the last itinerant songwriter from the Midi with uninterrupted Trouvère (i.e. French-Speaking Troubadour) tradition.

Discography 
2007 : Le cul de ma sœur
2006 : Compilation Paysâme
2006 : Compilation Toulouse en chanson
2004 : L'envers de l'ange
2001 : Live for Dimey - Made in Toulouse (with Lionel Suarez)
1999 : Les ailes de Jehan
1998 : Dimey Divin
1996 : Paroles de Dimey

References

External links 
 Official Website
 Jhean in Lyon

Living people
1957 births